The 1969 Denver Broncos season was the team's tenth season as a franchise, and their final season in the American Football League (AFL) before the league merged with the National Football League (NFL). Led by third-year head coach and general manager Lou Saban, the Broncos were 5–8–1, fourth place in the AFL West for the seventh straight season. 

Denver opened with two victories at home, but were winless in their previous five games entering the season finale; they avoided the division cellar with a home win over Cincinnati in the final AFL game for both.

Of the original eight franchises, Denver was the only one to never play in the AFL postseason.  Six of the teams won league titles; the other exception was Boston, who won their sole division title via a tiebreaker game in 1963.  The Broncos posted their first winning record in 1973 and made their first postseason in 1977, advancing to Super Bowl XII.

Offseason

NFL draft

Undrafted free agents

Personnel

Staff

Roster

Regular season

Schedule

Standings

References

External links
Denver Broncos – 1969 media guide
1969 Denver Broncos at Pro-Football-Reference.com

Denver Broncos seasons
Denver Broncos
1969 in sports in Colorado